The rotavirus nonstructural protein NSP4  was the first viral enterotoxin discovered.  It is a viroporin and induces diarrhea and causes Ca2+-dependent transepithelial secretion.

A transmembrane glycoprotein, NSP4 is organized into three main domains: a three-helical TM domain in the N-terminus (also a viroporin domain), a central cytoplasmic coiled-coil domain for multimerization, and an C-terminal flexible region. It can also be secreted out of the cell. As of 2019, only structures of the central domain, which is responsible for diarrhea, has been solved. It oligomerizes into dimeric, tetrameric, pentameric, and even higher-order forms.

References 

Rotaviruses
Viral nonstructural proteins